Thomas Williams was an African-American man who was lynched by a mob in Memphis, Tennessee, on September 28, 1927.

John R. Steelman, who wrote his PhD dissertation on "mob action in the South", listed Williams as one of the cases, wrote: "'The bullet-riddled body of Thomas Williams, alleged to have attacked a fifty-year old white woman, was found in Pleasant Union Churchyard, two miles from the scene of the crime' - near Memphis."

References

External links

1927 in Tennessee
1927 murders in the United States
History of Shelby County, Tennessee
Lynching deaths in Tennessee
Murdered African-American people
People murdered in Tennessee
Race-related controversies in the United States
Racially motivated violence against African Americans
African-American history in Memphis, Tennessee